The Erl-King is a 1970 novel by the French writer Michel Tournier. It is also known as The Ogre. It tells the story of a man who recruits children to be Nazis in the belief that he is protecting them. The novel received the Prix Goncourt. The 1996 film The Ogre, directed by Volker Schlöndorff, is based on the novel.

Summary 

The story is about Abel Tiffauges, who attends the Saint-Christophe boarding-school where he meets Nestor, a privileged student who will take him under his wing and adore him so much as to let him indulge his obsessions.
Abel first writes about his childhood and his life in life before 1939 in his personal diary. 
After World War I, Abel finds himself being a dedicated pigeon keeper and a soldier in Alsace.
Then, he is taken prisoner and deported throughout Germany and Poland in East Prussia (German region that corresponds to the current Kaliningrad Oblast/Königsberg in Western Russia).

He will later be imprisoned in the Moorhof camp (close to Insterburg – today Chernyakhovsk – and to Gumbinnen – today Gusev), and will then make it to the reservation of Rominten (in the South-Eastern part of East Prussia), in the hunting ground of Göring he calls "the ogre of Rominten". He then finds himself having to recruit children in the Mazurian region. He saves Ephraïm, a Jewish boy who came from a Lithuanian camp and escapes while carrying him on his back through swamps. The novel ends with the following sentence:

See also
 1970 in literature
 20th-century French literature

References

1970 French novels
Novels by Michel Tournier
Novels set during World War II
French novels adapted into films
Prix Goncourt winning works
Éditions Gallimard books